Velu or Waylu may refer to:

People
 Suthivelu (1947–2012), Telugu actor
 Velu Nachiyar (1730–1790s), queen regnant of Indian Sivaganga in 1760-1790
 Velu Prabhakaran, Indian filmmaker, cinematographer and actor
 Velu Thampi Dalawa (1765–1809), Dalawa or Prime Minister of the Indian kingdom of Travancore between 1802 and 1809
 E. V. Velu, former minister for Food in Tamil Nadu state of India
 Lucienne Velu (1902–1998), French athlete and basketball player
 R. Velu (born 1940), Indian politician of the Pattali Makkal Katchi (PMK) party
 A. M. Velu, Indian politician
 Velu Muthu Mukandar (died 1855), first Protestant Christian in the Megnanapuram Circle in Tamil Nadu

Places
 Vélu, a commune in northern France
 Velu, Iran (disambiguation)

Films 
 Aruva Velu, a 1996 Tamil drama film directed by P. S. Bharathi Kannan
 Maanja Velu, a 2010 Tamil language action film directed by A. Venkatesh

Others 
 Velu (genus), an insect genus in the tribe Empoascini
 Murugan, the Hindu deity who carries a spear or "vel"